The Xiaomi Redmi Note Prime is a smartphone released in December 2015 in India, developed by the Chinese company Xiaomi Inc. It is a part of the Redmi Note series of smartphones, and succeeded the Redmi Note 4G. Visually similar to its predecessor, it comes with a 5.5-inch screen, a quad-core 1.2 GHz Qualcomm Snapdragon 410 processor and runs MIUI 7 based on Android 4.4, which can be upgraded to MIUI 9 based on.

Features
The Redmi Note Prime has a 5.5 inch HD 720p IPS display, supporting 16-million colors. The device is powered by Qualcomm® Snapdragon 410 and equipped with 2 GB RAM and 16 GB internal storage expandable by microSD slot up to 64 GB. The device also supports LTE-4G Dual SIM with Dual standby. Other features include a microphone, GPS, an 13MP rear camera with auto-focus and LED flash, a 5MP front camera. The battery is 3100mAh which provides 775 hours of stand by. The rear camera is capable of recording videos at 1080p resolution, while the front camera supports 720p resolution recording.

See also
 List of Android devices
 MIUI

References

External links
  – official site

Phablets
Android (operating system) devices
Mobile phones introduced in 2015
Discontinued smartphones
Mobile phones with user-replaceable battery